Marion Van Cuyck is an American actress known for portraying Terra Newback on Hulu's PEN15 and on Netflix's "Frankenstein's Monster's Monster, Frankenstein".

Film

Television

References

External links
 

2000s births
Living people
Actresses from Los Angeles
21st-century American women